The TH gene codes for the enzyme tyrosine hydroxylase.

Gene product
Tyrosine hydroxylase is the rate limiting enzyme responsible for the transformation of L-Tyrosine to L-3,4-dihydroxyphenylalanine (L-DOPA), a catecholamine precursor. Catecholamines, dopamine, epinephrine, and norepinephrine, signal different stressors so the body can activate pathways to return towards homeostasis. In response to fetal hypoxia, catecholamines can maintain glucose levels, but also naturally increases during gestation. Catecholamine secretions typically follows sympathetic nervous stimulation in adults, but in a fetus, this system for secretion is not yet developed or understood. However, there is some plasticity observed as when adults lose nerve function, they revert to this non-neurogenic catecholamine release system.

Gene regulation
Mutations in the TH gene may cause tyrosine hydroxylase deficiency (THD), a rare neurometabolic disorder inherited in an autosomal recessive manner. Patients with severe THD may have defective catecholamine synthesis resulting in major neurological and motor deficits. Activation of the TH gene requires cyclic adenosine monophosphate (cAMP) to cause a conformation change upon binding to protein kinase A (PKA). PKA can phosphorylate both the TH gene for transcription and the tyrosine hydroxylase protein to increase its efficiency. This activation is altered by upstream cis-acting motifs – AP1, AP2, and cAMP response element.  The cAMP response element, 38-45 base pairs upstream, plays a bigger role in gene regulation than the others.

References 

Human genes